Franz Hermann Reinhold von Frank (May 2, 1827 – February 7, 1894) was a German theologian born in Altenburg. He was an important figure in the "Erlangen School" of the German Neo-Lutheranism movement, and a specialist in theological dogmatics.

In 1850 he received his PhD at the University of Leipzig, where he was a disciple of Gottlieb Christoph von Harless. Afterwards, he worked as a school subrector in Ratzeburg, and in 1853 began teaching classes at the Gymnasium in Altenburg. In 1857 he was appointed professor of church history and systematic theology at the University of Erlangen. He died in Erlangen.

Written works 
 System der christlichen Gewissheit, 1870-1873 (2 volumes) – System of Christian certainty.
 System der christlichen Wahrheit, 1878-1880 (2 volumes) – System of Christian truth.
 System der christlichen Sittlichkeit, 1884-1887 (2 volumes) – System of Christian morality.
 Über die kirchliche Bedeutung der Theologie A. Ritschl's: Conferenzvortrag, 1888 – On the ecclesiastical importance of Albrecht Ritschl's theology.
 Zur Theologie A. Ritschl's (third edition, 1891) – On the theology of Albrecht Ritschl.  
 Dogmatische Studien, 1892 – Dogmatic studies.
 Geschichte und Kritik der neueren Theologie insbesondere der systematischen, seit Schleiermacher, 1898 – History and criticism of modern theology : in particular, the systematic, since Friedrich Schleiermacher.

References 
 The New Schaff-Herzog Encyclopedia of Religious Knowledge (biography)

1827 births
1894 deaths
People from Altenburg
19th-century German Protestant theologians
German Lutheran theologians
Historians of Christianity
Leipzig University alumni
Academic staff of the University of Erlangen-Nuremberg
German male non-fiction writers
19th-century male writers
German historians of religion
19th-century Lutherans